The Jelgava–Liepāja Railway is a  long,  gauge railway built in the 20th century to connect the cities Jelgava and Liepāja, Latvia.

References 

Railway lines in Latvia
Jelgava
Transport in Liepāja
Railway lines opened in 1929
1929 establishments in Latvia
5 ft gauge railways in Latvia